Lucozade is a British brand of soft drink manufactured and marketed by the Japanese company Suntory. Created as "Glucozade" in the UK in 1927 by a Newcastle pharmacist, William Walker Hunter (trading as W. Owen & Son), it was acquired by the British pharmaceutical company Beecham's in 1938 and sold as Lucozade, an energy drink for the sick. Its advertising slogan was "Lucozade aids recovery". It was sold mostly in pharmacies up until the 1980s before it was more readily available as a sports drink in shops across the UK.

A glucose and water solution, the product was sold until 1983 as a carbonated, slightly orange-flavoured drink in a glass bottle wrapped in orange cellophane. Pharmacists sold it, children were given it when ill, and hospital visitors would regularly arrive with a bottle. It was rebranded in 1978 as a "pick me up", and as a sports drink in 1983, to associate it with health rather than sickness. The company switched to a plastic bottle and introduced a range of flavours. , a 500 ml bottle contained 62 g (15.5 cubes) of sugar, more than Coca-Cola. In 2017, to avoid sugar tax, the drink was reformulated to contain 22.5 g of sugar per 500 ml of liquid, as well as the artificial sweeteners aspartame and acesulfame K.

The UK’s No. 1 energy drink, it has been exported to Asia and Australasia. In 1989, the Beecham Group merged to form SmithKline Beecham, which further merged in 2000 to form GlaxoSmithKline. In September 2013, GlaxoSmithKline sold Lucozade and another soft drink, Ribena, to the Japanese drinks conglomerate Suntory for £1.35 billion.

History 
 
"Glucozade" was invented by William Walker Hunter in 1927 in Newcastle; Hunter had taken over the business of pharmacist William Owen. Hunter sold the product to the Beecham Group in 1938 and it was eventually renamed Lucozade.

In 1953, a factory for the production of Lucozade products was opened in Brentford, west London, which, until 2004, had an iconic sign seen on the side of the M4 motorway (now in Gunnersbury Park Museum). 

Lucozade originally was available in only one variety, which was effervescent with a distinctive sweet citric flavour. It was sold in a glass bottle with a yellow cellophane wrap until 1983, when it was re-branded as an energy drink to remove the brand's associations with illness. The slogan "Lucozade aids recovery" was replaced by "Lucozade replaces lost energy". The glass bottle was replaced by a plastic (polyethylene terephthalate (PET)) one. After the re-branding, UK sales tripled to almost £75 million between 1984 and 1989.

In 1989, the Beecham Group and SmithKline Beckman merged to form SmithKline Beecham, and in 2000 SmithKline Beecham and GlaxoWellcome merged to form GlaxoSmithKline (GSK). In 2013, GSK put Ribena and Lucozade up for sale. Suntory, a Japanese holding company, bought the brands in September for £1.35 billion. At the time of the sale, the product was manufactured in England at the Royal Forest Factory in Coleford, Gloucestershire, in the Forest of Dean.

Commercials 
Following its rebranding as a sports drink, high-profile athletic figures in British pop culture have promoted Lucozade in television commercials, beginning with Olympic decathlon champion Daley Thompson in 1983, followed by sporting figures such as Olympic sprint champion Linford Christie, footballers John Barnes and Alan Shearer, rugby player Jonny Wilkinson, and Tomb Raider heroine Lara Croft.

Purpose and effectiveness

A stated purpose of sports drinks, which provide many calories of energy from sugars, is to improve performance and endurance. In an analysis by Matthew Thompson and colleagues from the Oxford Centre for Evidence Based Medicine, of 431 marketing claims of performance enhancement, most cited no evidence. 174 sources were cited for Lucozade; of them, Thompson found only three studies of high quality with a low risk of bias. The rigorous studies that did show improved endurance were "of limited relevance to most people because the tests were on elite athletes". This was backed up by a research study done on professional cyclists, to see if ingesting Lucozade before an hour bike ride would impact performance. The study could not find any positive impact on performance after ingesting it.  Thompson said that for the vast majority of people drinking such products "could completely counteract exercising more, playing football more, going to the gym more".

Lucozade comes in the form of liquid in either a can or plastic bottle, or it can come in the form of a tablet. The tablets have the flavours of either orange or the original flavour. 

The drinks are marketed as soft drinks; a soft drinks industry spokesman said in response: "By helping people participating in sport to perform better and to recover more quickly, sports drinks can encourage people to exercise more".

In May 2016, Liverpool City Council ran a "name-and-shame campaign" entitled "Is your child’s sweet tooth harming their health?". The short-lived campaign claimed that Lucozade was "the worst offender", containing 62 grams of sugar in a 500 ml bottle, followed by Coca-Cola with 54 grams. Posters for the campaign were displayed in hospitals for a time.

In its original high-sugar formulation, Lucozade was recommended by UK diabetes charities as an immediate treatment for hypoglycaemia in individuals who take insulin. Since the drink now includes artificial sweeteners, guidelines have been amended to state that Lucozade should not be used to treat diabetic hypoglycaemia.

Composition
While the ingredients vary somewhat from one drink to another, those of the Lucozade Original Energy were listed as follows in 2013: carbonated water, glucose syrup (25%), citric acid (E330), lactic acid (E270), flavouring (unspecified), preservatives (potassium sorbate, sodium bisulphite (E-222)), caffeine, antioxidant (ascorbic acid), colour (sunset yellow (E110), Ponceau 4R). Since the reformulation to lower sugar in 2017, Lucozade Original contains the artificial sweeteners aspartame and acesulfame K.

A warning is printed on the packaging that the colouring may have an adverse effect on activity and attention in children. Nutritional information for 380 ml bottle: energy 1129 kjoules = 266 kCal; protein, fat and fibre nil; carbohydrates 65.4 g of which sugars 33.1 g of which 65.4 g glucose-based; and sodium trace. Packaging also warns that spilt Lucozade may stain. A 380 ml bottle of Lucozade contains 46 mg of caffeine, about as much as a cup of tea.

Lucozade contains 0.01% ethanol (alcohol), which meant that observant Muslims could not drink it. However, in 2004, the Muslim Council of Britain ruled that they saw no harm in consuming Lucozade which contains traces of ethyl alcohol that do not bear its original qualities and do not change the taste, colour or smell. GlaxoSmithKline pointed out that fruit juices and bread could also contain the same or higher trace amounts of alcohol due to natural fermentation.

Variants

Lucozade Energy
 Original 
 Orange
 Wild Cherry 
 Pink Lemonade
 Apple Blast 
 Strawberry
 Raspberry Ripple
 Watermelon & Strawberry
 Caribbean Crush
 Brazilian Mango & Mandarin
 Citrus Chill

Lucozade Zero
 Original 
 Orange
 Pink Lemonade
 Tropical

Lucozade Sport
 Orange 
 Caribbean Burst
 Brazilian Guava
 Raspberry
 Cherry
 Mango & Passion Fruit 
 Fruit Punch (AJ Edition)
 Low Cal - Orange
 Low Cal - Lemon & Lime

Lucozade Alert
 Original
 Tropical Burst
 Cherry Blast

Sponsorships

Lucozade Sport is a major sponsor of events, teams and athletes in the UK and Ireland, including the Amateur Rowing Association (ARA), FA Premier League, FA Cup, England Rugby Football Union, England Football Team, the Republic Of Ireland Football Team, the London Marathon, Parkrun, Michael Owen, Steven Gerrard, Damien Duff, Ronan O'Gara and Ben Wynne. The McLaren Formula One team was previously sponsored by Lucozade. The brand has also sponsored Jamaican sprinter Asafa Powell since he first broke the 100 m World Record in 2005. They honoured his Beijing Summer Olympics achievements with a small function in October 2008.

Collaborations 

In 2017, British fashion supplier Missguided was included in a campaign by Lucozade Zero. Coded cans were offered at booths in crowded areas that entitled drinkers to discounts on Missguided products.

Explanatory notes

References

External links
 

British soft drink brands
Energy drinks
Irish drinks
Japanese drinks
Products introduced in 1927
Sports drinks
Suntory